Club Deportivo Actur Pablo Iglesias is a football team based in Zaragoza in the autonomous community of Aragón. They currently play in Regional Preferente. Its stadium is Pablo Iglesias.

Season to season

0 seasons in Tercera División

External links
Official website  

Football clubs in Aragon
Sport in Zaragoza
Association football clubs established in 1999
1999 establishments in Spain